James Huckerby  (1826 – 25 March 1900) was a 19th-century builder and architect based in Beeston, Nottingham.

History
He was born in 1826 in Long Clawson, Leicestershire, the son of James Huckerby (1804-1887) and Sarah Swain (1804-1888).

On 18 July 1854 he married Mary Ann Shrewsbury, eldest daughter of Thomas Shrewsbury in St John the Baptist Church, Beeston.

He was a builder who also acted as a Clerk of Works and Architect for local businessmen in Beeston.

He died on 25 March 1900 at his residence 8 The City, Beeston, Nottingham and left an estate valued at £413 17s 4d..

Works
4 houses, Middleton Street, Beeston, Nottingham 1887
Pair of villas, 13-15 Hampden Street, Beeston, Nottingham 1887
Pair of villas, Thornhill Street (now Imperial Road), Beeston, Nottingham 1887-88
Oban House, 8 Chilwell Road, Beeston ca. 1890 (attributed)
House, Cromwell Street, Beeston, Nottingham 1890
2 Pairs of Villas, Willoughby Street, Beeston, Nottingham 1891
Seven houses, 1-11 Clinton Street, Beeston, Nottingham 1891
Pair of Villas for William Bacton, Denison Street, Beeston, Nottingham 1892
Anglo Scotian Mills, Beeston 1892
House for William Lowe, 52 Denison Street, Beeston, Nottingham 1893
House for Mr Turner, Styring Street, Beeston, Nottingham 1893
Houses in Grange Avenue, Beeston 1893-94 (with Arthur Richard Calvert)
Semi-detached houses at 17-19 Chilwell Road, Beeston 1894
House, Clinton Street, Beeston, Nottingham 1894
House for John Lee, 90 Denison Street, Beeston, Nottingham 1895
Pair of Villas for Mrs Brecknock, Park Street, Beeston, Nottingham 1895
House and shop alterations for Mr Hooley, 101 Wollaton Road, Beeston, Nottingham 1895
Two houses and stabling for William Low, Denison Street, Beeston, Nottingham 1898-99
Five houses for Mr. J. Stone, Denison Street, Beeston, Nottingham 1897
Pair of villas for Mr A. Elliot, Denison Street, Beeston, Nottingham 1898-99

References

19th-century English architects
Architects from Nottingham
1826 births
1900 deaths
Architects from Leicestershire